Achada Leite is a settlement on the west coast of the island of Santiago, Cape Verde. It is part of the municipality of Santa Catarina. It lies 2.5 km south of Ribeira da Barca and 11 km west of the municipal seat Assomada. In 2010 its population was 142.

References

Villages and settlements in Santiago, Cape Verde
Santa Catarina, Cape Verde